

Seeds
Champion seeds are indicated in bold text while text in italics indicates the round in which those seeds were eliminated.

 Patricio Cornejo /  Jaime Fillol (quarterfinals)
 Brian Gottfried /  Raúl Ramírez (final)
 Anand Amritraj /  Vijay Amritraj (quarterfinals)
 Charlie Pasarell /  Erik van Dillen (first round)

Draw

External links
 1974 Paris Open Doubles draw

Doubles